The Operation King Kong was a joint military operation of the United States Navy and the Republic of China Armed Forces that started on the 8th February, 1955. The objective was to withdraw soldiers, people and military equipment and supplies from the Dachen Islands, Pishan Island and Yushan Island to Taiwan.

Background

Although the Chinese Communist Party had established the People's Republic of China on October 1, 1949, the Chinese Civil War did not end at that time. In 1955, the Communists had already targeted Dachen Archipelago when they attacked the Yijiangshan Islands in Zhejiang province, but the Communists were incapable of simultaneously taking both of them. During the Battle of Yijiangshan Islands, the Communists bombed Dachen archipelago. One of the main reasons was to prevent the Nationalist garrison of Dachen Archipelago from reinforcing the Yijiangshan Islands. In fact, from November 1, 1954 thru November 4, 1954, within not more than 4 days, the People's Liberation Army Air Force had flown 49 sorties to bomb Dachen Archipelago, but none of the 721 bombs dropped hit their intended targets. On November 10, 1954, the Liberation Army bombers flew more than 70 sorties to support of the bombers to strike Nationalist army warships in the Dachen Archipelago, but only inflicted minor damages on five warships. The unsuccessful strikes were because the experienced aircrew was busy preparing for the Battle of Yijiangshan Islands and missions against Dachen Archipelago were performed by inexperienced aircrew. However, after experiencing the two rather unsuccessful bombings, the Nationalists mistakenly believed that this was all that the Liberation Army air force was capable of and started to relax. However, they would pay a heavy price later on in 1955, after the end of the Battle of Yijiangshan Islands, when the combat-hardened aircrew with experience struck the Dachen Archipelago again.

Battle
After the main battle of the Yijiangshan Islands had subsided, the Liberation Army immediately turned their attentions to Dachen Archipelago, before declaring the Yijiangshan Islands secured. In fact it was not a Battle as people think, because the Liberation Army was mainly using their air force to keep bombing Dachen Archipelago and the Nationalist army was unable to strike back. And another disadvantages to the Nationalist army was that since the Liberation Army used Nationalist army equipment captured during the Chinese Civil War, they were able to intercept Nationalist communications, since both sides used radios made in USA. So during the battle, despite the casualties being minimal, the local Nationalist garrison was forced to use unencrypted radios to communicate with Taiwan and among themselves.

On January 19, 1955, the first Liberation Army bombing mission specifically targeting Dachen was carried out by combat-hardened aircrew with experience. Due to the previous two unsuccessful Communist bombing missions, the Nationalist army believed that this third air raid would be equally inept and were not fully prepared. As a result, the infrastructures on the islands, especially those for communication were severely damaged. 
On the same day, the second wave of attacks from the Liberation Army also occurred. Although the local Nationalist garrison regrouped and set up some more effective air defines, the effort was futile in fact. The reason why was because the second wave of attack struck a place completely unexpected by the Nationalist garrison: the reservoir, which was not considered a military target with any significance in the Nationalist's eyes. Through the bombing, the reservoir was completely destroyed and without any fresh water supply readily available, it was nearly impossible to defend the archipelago.

Retreat
After the battle and bombing in the Dachen Archipelago, the Nationalist government of the Republic of China understood that it was hard to control the Dachen and adjacent archipelagos. They finally agreed with the American government to hold out until an evacuation was carried out by the U.S. Navy in February 1955 to Taiwan more than for 200 miles away to the south to conserve military strength. The United States Navy used the code name "Operation King Kong" for this retreat.

Operation Content

The decision was made to withdraw on February 5, 1955; the main content of the Operation had included two military forces, how to distribute different duties would be very important, in this case, U.S. Army and Nationalist army of the Republic of China were in charge of different areas：

(1). U.S. Seventh Fleet helped to protect the retreat of soldiers, people and military resources in Dachen archipelago, Pishan Island, Yushan Island.

(2). U.S. Navy and Nationalist army cooperated for minesweeper.

(3). U.S. Navy and Nationalist army cooperated for air monitor and garrison.

(4). Divided operation into 3 plans (plan A, B and C) base on different islands, Plan A and C combine, implemented on February 8 in Dachen archipelago. Plan B implemented on February 9 in Pishan and Yushan islands.

The U.S. Seventh Fleet used 132 boats and 400 aircraft to move 14,500 civilians, 14,000 Republic of China government officers, and soldiers, along with 40,000 tons of military equipment and supplies from the Dachen and adjacent archipelagos. After the evacuation, the last Flag of the Republic of China in Dachen was lowered by Jiang Jingguo, and the Zhejiang province government was abolished in the Republic of China as Dachen was their last stronghold in the province.

External links
BBC - 1955: US evacuates Pacific islands
Tachen Islands Evacuation History
Pictures of the evacuation

Battles involving China
King Kong
Chinese Civil War
1955 in China
1955 in Taiwan
Taiwan–United States military relations
China–United States military relations
Presidency of Dwight D. Eisenhower